Vaglio Serra is a comune (municipality) in the Province of Asti in the Italian region Piedmont, located about  southeast of Turin and about  southeast of Asti.

Vaglio Serra borders the following municipalities: Cortiglione, Incisa Scapaccino, Nizza Monferrato, and Vinchio.

Demographic evolution

References

Cities and towns in Piedmont